Simon Enqvist (born 2 October 1988) is a Finnish football goalkeeper.

After playing on low tiers in Sweden and Finland, Enqvist joined IF Finströms Kamraterna in the 2008 Kakkonen before being picked up by first-tier club IFK Mariehamn in the same season. He played 5 games in the 2008 Veikkausliiga. After spending 2009 in another club, he returned to Mariehamn in 2010 without playing. He also played 5 games for the Åland Islands official football team in the 2009 Island Games.

References

1988 births
Living people
Sportspeople from Åland
Finnish footballers
Association football goalkeepers
IFK Mariehamn players
Kakkonen players
Veikkausliiga players